The following is an incomplete list of arrested mayors in Turkey.

References 

Lists of mayors of places in Turkey
Politicians arrested in Turkey
Mayors of places in Turkey
People expelled from public office
Prisoners and detainees of Turkey
Turkish prisoners and detainees